East Wretham Mill  is a tower mill at East Wretham, Norfolk, England which has been converted to residential accommodation.

History

East Wretham Mill was first mentioned in an advert in 1875, when it was described as "newly erected". A mill had been marked on the site in 1826 when it appeared on Bryant's map. Millers are recorded at this mill up to 1872. Edmund Land was the miller in 1878, having previously been at Stow Bedon smock mill. Walter Weggett was the next miller He was followed by Walter Littleproud in 1883.

The mill was derelict by 1926 and was converted to residential accommodation c1958.

Description

East Wretham Mill is a four-storey tower mill which had a domed cap which was winded by a fantail. The mill had four double Patent sails, one pair of which had eight bays of three shutters. The mill drove two pairs of French Burr millstones.

Millers

Edmund Land 1878
Walter Weggett 1879-81
Walter Littleproud 1883-

Reference for above:-

References

External links
Windmill World webpage on East Wretham Mill.

Windmills completed in 1875
Towers completed in 1875
Windmills in Norfolk
Tower mills in the United Kingdom
Grinding mills in the United Kingdom